Octonal may be:

 an adjective referring to an octal (base-8) number system
 a name for the mixture of cyclotetramethylenetetranitramine, trinitrotoluene and aluminium

See also 
 Octon (disambiguation)
 Octanal, an aldehyde
 Octanol, an alcohol
 Octenol, an alcohol
 Octagonal